Anopina anotera is a moth of the family Tortricidae. It is found in Guatemala.

References

Moths described in 1914
anotera
Moths of Central America